Pedro Fernández de Castro, also known as Pedro Fernández de Fuentecalada ( – 1184), was the first Grand Master of the Order of Santiago and the founder of the Monastery of Santa Cruz de Valcárcel.  He was a Spanish nobleman and a member of the House of Castro.

Family origins 
Pedro was the son of Fernando García de Hita, founder of the powerful Castro family, by his wife Estefanía Ermengol, daughter of Ermengol V, Count of Urgell.

Biography 

Pedro fought in the army of Alfonso VII of León and Castile in the conquest of Aurelia and Alharilla in the present day area of Santa Cruz de la Zarza.  Later in 1146, he participated in further military campaigns, assisting in the occupation of Baeza and the landings in Almería.  These actions were an important part of the overall military campaign because they devastated the Moorish navy and largely removed them from the war at large.

Later, while crusading in the Holy Land, he decided to create a new military order dedicated to protecting the sepulcher of James the Apostle and to protecting the Way of St. James.

On 4 August 1165, Pedro, together with his wife, his sister Urraca, and his children, donated a house to abbot Miguel in Santa Cruz de Valcárcel for the purpose of founding a monastery dedicated to the principles of the order. The donation was confirmed by his wife's brothers, Nuño and Álvaro Pérez de Lara, in addition to Gómez González de Manzanedo, the husband of Pedro's sister-in-law, Milia Pérez de Lara, as well as his brothers and other members of the Castro family.  Later that year, at the age of 50, Pedro Fernández officially founded the Order of Santiago in the city of Cáceres.  The spirit of the order was born in the times of the Almohad invasion and is influenced by the Knights Templar, to which Pedro had become acquainted with in the Holy Land.  His wife and daughter would later become nuns at the Monastery of Santa Cruz de Valcárcel.

Francisco de Rades y Andrada, in his chronicles of military orders, records Pedro's death in 1184, being buried in the main chapel of the Convent of San Marcos, León.

Marriage and descendants 
Pedro Fernández married María Pérez de Lara, daughter of count Pedro González de Lara, with whom he had the following children:

 Fernando Pérez de Castro: known as "Potestad".  Married Teresa Bermúdez, with children.
 Gómez Pérez de Castro, tenente of the territory of Santullán.
 Elo Pérez de Castro, first abbess at the  Monastery of Santa Cruz de Valcárcel.
 María Pérez de Castro, also known as María de Aragón.
 Milia Pérez de Castro

Notes

References

Biography 

 
 
 
 

1110s births
1184 deaths
Spanish untitled nobility
Grand Masters of the Order of Santiago